"Blood-stained Glory" (Traditional Chinese: 血染的風采, Simplified Chinese: 血染的风采) is a Chinese patriotic military song written in 1986, originally used to commemorate those who died during the Sino-Vietnamese War. Many singers have covered the song, including Peng Liyuan, Dong Wenhua and Anita Mui.

References

External links

Mandarin-language songs
1987 songs
Song articles with missing songwriters